is a Japanese football player for Omiya Ardija.

National team career
In October 2013, Motegi was elected Japan U-17 national team for 2013 U-17 World Cup. He played 3 matches.

Club statistics
Updated to 20 February 2019.

References

External links

Profile at Montedio Yamagata
Profile at Ehime FC

1996 births
Living people
Association football people from Saitama Prefecture
Japanese footballers
J1 League players
J2 League players
J3 League players
Urawa Red Diamonds players
Ehime FC players
J.League U-22 Selection players
Montedio Yamagata players
Association football defenders

Omiya Ardija players